The Kingcome Range is a subrange of the Pacific Ranges of the Coast Mountains, located to the east of Kingcome Inlet.

See also
Kingcome River
Kingcome Glacier
Kingcome (disambiguation)

References

Pacific Ranges